Acalyptris tenuijuxtus is a moth of the family Nepticulidae. It is found in the Florida Keys of the United States.

The length of the forewings is 1.4–1.6 mm. Adults have been collected from early October to late November.

External links
New Leaf-Mining Moths of the Family Nepticulidae from Florida

Nepticulidae
Endemic fauna of Florida
Moths of North America
Taxa named by Donald R. Davis (entomologist)
Moths described in 1978